Globemaster may refer to:

Aircraft
Globemaster is the name of three separate airlifters, produced by Douglas Aircraft Company or its successors:

Other uses 
 Globemaster Air Cargo, a defunct Canadian Airline
 VR-56 "Globemasters", a U.S. Navy Reserve transport squadron in naval aviation

See also

 
 
 Master (disambiguation)
 Globe (disambiguation)